The Mozambique Under-16 national basketball team represents Mozambique in international basketball matches and is controlled by the Mozambique Basketball Federation. At continental level, it competes in the FIBA Africa Under-16 Championship. Mozambique has been a member of FIBA since 1978.

International competitions 
Mozambique has never qualified for the Olympic Games nor the FIBA Under-17 Basketball World Cup.

FIBA Under-17 World Championship record
 2010 FIBA Under-17 World Championship: N/Q
 2012 FIBA Under-17 World Championship: N/Q
 2014 FIBA Under-17 World Championship: N/Q

2017 squad

Source:

Head coach position
 João Mulungo

References

External links
Profile - Mozambique, FIBA.com Retrieved 2018-01-15

Men's national under-16 basketball teams
Basketball in Mozambique
basketball